This is a list of the Byzantine emperors from the foundation of Constantinople in 330 AD, which marks the conventional start of the Eastern Roman Empire, to its fall to the Ottoman Empire in 1453 AD. Only the emperors who were recognized as legitimate rulers and exercised sovereign authority are included, to the exclusion of junior co-emperors (symbasileis) who never attained the status of sole or senior ruler, as well as of the various usurpers or rebels who claimed the imperial title.

The following list starts with Constantine the Great, the first Christian emperor, who rebuilt the city of Byzantium as an imperial capital, Constantinople, and who was regarded by the later emperors as the model ruler. It was under Constantine that the major characteristics of what is considered the Byzantine state emerged: a Roman polity centered at Constantinople and culturally dominated by the Greek East, with Christianity as the state religion.

The Byzantine Empire was the direct legal continuation of the eastern half of the Roman Empire following the division of the Roman Empire in 395. Emperors listed below up to Theodosius I in 395 were sole or joint rulers of the entire Roman Empire. The Western Roman Empire continued until 476. Byzantine emperors considered themselves to be rightful Roman emperors in direct succession from Augustus; the term "Byzantine" was coined by Western historiography only in the 16th century. The use of the title "Roman Emperor" by those ruling from Constantinople was not contested until after the papal coronation of the Frankish Charlemagne as Holy Roman Emperor (25 December 800), done partly in response to the Byzantine coronation of Empress Irene, whose claim, as a woman, was not recognized by Pope Leo III.

In practice, according to the Hellenistic political system, the Byzantine emperor had been given total power through God to shape the state and its subjects, he was the last authority and legislator of the empire and all his work was in imitation of the sacred kingdom of God, also according to the Christian principles, he was the ultimate benefecator and protector of his people.

The title of all Emperors preceding Heraclius was officially "Augustus", although other titles such as Dominus were also used. Their names were preceded by Imperator Caesar and followed by Augustus. Following Heraclius, the title commonly became the Greek Basileus (Gr. Βασιλεύς), which had formerly meant sovereign, though Augustus continued to be used in a reduced capacity. Following the establishment of the rival Holy Roman Empire in Western Europe, the title "Autokrator" (Gr. Αὐτοκράτωρ) was increasingly used. In later centuries, the Emperor could be referred to by Western Christians as the "Emperor of the Greeks". Towards the end of the Empire, the standard imperial formula of the Byzantine ruler was "[Emperor's name] in Christ, Emperor and Autocrat of the Romans" (cf. Ῥωμαῖοι and Rûm).

In the medieval period, dynasties were common, but the principle of hereditary succession was never formalized in the Empire, and hereditary succession was a custom rather than an inviolable principle.



See also 

 Family tree of Byzantine emperors
 List of Roman emperors
 List of Trapezuntine emperors
 List of Roman usurpers
 List of Byzantine usurpers
 Succession to the Byzantine Empire
 List of Roman and Byzantine empresses
 List of Byzantine emperors of Armenian origin
 Family tree of Roman emperors
 History of the Byzantine Empire

Notes

References 

 
Byzantine Empire
Byzantine emperors
Emperors